Shwe Moe Ngwe Moe Thoon Phyo Lo Ywar is a 2016 Burmese comedy television series. It aired on MNTV, from July 24 to December 4, 2016, on every sunday at 19:20 for 20 episodes.

Cast
Htun Htun as Shwe Moe
Ye Lay as Thiha
Nyi Htut Khaung as Ngwe Moe
Joker as Joker
Nan Myat Phyo Thin as Thoon Phyo
Hsu Myat Noe Oo as Kit Kit
May Pan Chi as Kay Thi
Than Than Soe as Daw Ar Kyal

References

Burmese television series
Myanmar National TV original programming